Aaron Anthony Lescott (born 2 December 1978 in Birmingham, West Midlands) is an English former professional footballer who played as a defender. Lescott played at a number of Football League clubs, most notably a six-year spell at Bristol Rovers and a three-year spell at Stockport County. A product of the Aston Villa Academy, he is the older brother of former Manchester City, Aston Villa, and England defender Joleon Lescott.

Playing career
Lescott started his career as a trainee with Aston Villa making only one first team appearance for them (in the FA Cup third round tie against Hull City). Unable to establish himself at Villa, he had a loan spell with Lincoln City in 2000, before signing for Sheffield Wednesday in October of the same year for a fee of £100,000.

He made 43 appearances for Sheffield Wednesday before moving to Stockport County in 2001 for a fee of £75,000. He made 81 appearances and scored one goal for County against Swindon Town, before leaving to join Bristol Rovers in August 2004. He won runner up in the 2007–2008 player of the year competition, with captain Stuart Campbell coming first.

In March 2010 he joined Cheltenham Town on a one-month loan, having been unable to regain his place in the Bristol Rovers team after recovering from injury.

Along with 14 other players, he was released by Rovers at the end of the 2009/10 season. On 14 July 2010 Lescott completed a free transfer move to League One outfit Walsall on a one-year contract following his release from Bristol Rovers. He scored his only goal for Walsall in a 2–2 draw with former club Bristol Rovers.

Following the expiry of that contract, Lescott sought out other clubs and went on trial with Yeovil Town in July 2011.

On 9 August 2011, Lescott signed for Halesowen Town.

References

External links
Lincoln City F.C. Official Archive Profile
Aaron Lescott player profile at bristolrovers.co.uk
Aaron Lescott player profile at stockportcounty.com

Unofficial Aaron Lescott Profile at The Forgotten Imp

1978 births
Footballers from Birmingham, West Midlands
Living people
Association football defenders
English footballers
Aston Villa F.C. players
Lincoln City F.C. players
Sheffield Wednesday F.C. players
Stockport County F.C. players
Bristol Rovers F.C. players
Cheltenham Town F.C. players
Walsall F.C. players
Halesowen Town F.C. players
English Football League players